The racket-tailed coquette (Discosura longicaudus; sometimes Discosura longicauda) is a species of hummingbird in the family Trochilidae native to northern South America.

Taxonomy
The racket-tailed coquette was formally described in 1788 by the German naturalist Johann Friedrich Gmelin in his revised and expanded edition of Carl Linnaeus's Systema Naturae. He placed it with all the other hummingbirds in the genus Trochilus and coined the binomial name Trochilus longicaudus. Gmelin based his description on the "L'oiseau-mouche à raquettes" that had been described by the French polymath Georges-Louis Leclerc, Comte de Buffon in 1779 in his Histoire Naturelle des Oiseaux. Buffon did not specify the origin of his specimen but in 1902 Hans von Berlepsch and Ernst Hartert designated the type locality as Cayenne, French Guiana. The racket-tailed coquette is now placed with four other hummingbirds in the genus Discosura that was introduced in 1850 by the French naturalist Charles Lucien Bonaparte. Formerly, ornithologists erroneously used the binomial name Discosura longicauda instead of Discosura longicaudus. The genus name combines the Ancient Greek diskos meaning "plate" with oura meaning "tail". The specific epithet longicaudus combines the Latin longus meaning "long" and cauda meaning "tail". The species is treated as monotypic: no subspecies are recognised.

It is sometimes considered to be the only member of the genus Discosura, as the thorntails, the other possible members of the genus, are often placed in the genus Popelairia.

Martin Johnson Heade depicted two coquettes in his painting Two Green-Breasted Hummingbirds, as part of his "Gems of Brazil".

Description
It has duller green upperparts and breast, black throat bordered by white and a white belly. Its tail is grey tipped with white, and lacks "rackets".

Distribution and habitat
The racket-tailed coquette has a wide distribution range; it is found in northern Brazil, French Guiana, Guyana, Suriname, and southern Venezuela. It is also found on the eastern tip of Brazil Its natural habitat is subtropical or tropical moist lowland forests, as well as riparian forests and scrubby savannahs.

Behavior
Racket-tailed coquettes typically gather in the canopy of hapaxanth trees with other hummingbirds and steal other larger hummingbirds' nectar. They are consequently chased by the larger birds.

They build their cup-sized nests out of soft plants and down  up a tree. Females usually have a clutch of two eggs, which are incubated for 13–14 days.

References

External links

racket-tailed coquette
Birds of the Atlantic Forest
Birds of the Guianas
Birds of the Amazon Basin
Birds of the Venezuelan Amazon
racket-tailed coquette
racket-tailed coquette
Birds of Brazil
Taxonomy articles created by Polbot